Sahid Smarak is situated at the west of Hetauda city. It is one of the parks in the Hetauda.

Madan Bhandari Sculpture

Madan Kumar Bhandari (June 27, 1952 – 1993) was a Nepalese politician and communist leader. He is one of the historical personalities in Nepal history who fought for democracy.
In 1993 Bhandari died, supposedly in a car accident. The place of accident is made showing Krishna vir along with roads and bridges and a sculpture of Madan Bhandari is kept in which he is pointing a finger implying unity.

References

Parks in Nepal